Sam Durant (born 1961, in Seattle) is a multimedia artist whose works engage social, political, and cultural issues. Often referencing American history, his work explores culture and politics, engaging subjects such as the civil rights movement, southern rock music, and modernism.

Education
Durant received a BFA in sculpture in 1986 from the Massachusetts College of Art and an MFA from California Institute of the Arts.

Career

1990s
His work of the 90s was inspired largely by the work of Robert Smithson, an artist interested in history and entropy. Durant's work has been exhibited internationally and in the United States. He has had solo museum exhibitions at the Museum of Contemporary Art, Los Angeles, Kunstverein für die Rheinlande und Westfalen, Düsseldorf, S.M.A.K., Ghent, Belgium, and the Govett-Brewster Art Gallery in New Zealand. His work has been included in the Panamá, Sydney, Venice, and Whitney Biennials. Durant shows with several galleries including Blum & Poe in Los Angeles, Paula Cooper Gallery in New York, Praz-Delavallade in Paris/Los Angeles and Sadie Coles HQ in London.

2000s
In 2005, his exhibition "Proposal for White and Indian Dead Monument Transpositions, Washington D.C." was shown at the Paula Cooper Gallery in New York. This work derived out of a residency he was conducting at the Walker Art Center in 2002. He reproduced 30 Indian massacre monuments that are based on similarities to the massive obelisk Washington monument. In 2006, he compiled and edited a comprehensive monograph of Black Panther artist Emory Douglas’ work. His recent curatorial credits include Eat the Market at the Los Angeles County Museum and Black Panther: the Revolutionary Art of Emory Douglas at The Museum of Contemporary Art in Los Angeles and the New Museum in New York. He has co-organized numerous group shows and artists benefits and is a co-founder of Transforma, a cultural rebuilding collective project in New Orleans. In addition, he was a finalist for the 2008 Hugo Boss Prize and has received a United States Artists Broad Fellowship and a City of Los Angeles Individual Artist Grant.

Scaffold

In June 2017, Durant erected a two-story wooden beam sculpture entitled Scaffold for display in the garden of the Walker Art Center in Minneapolis, Minnesota.  The sculpture was intended to represent "the gallows used in seven hangings from 1859 to 2006 sanctioned by the U.S. government", as well as "America's history of state violence and its use of the death penalty".

Scaffold had previously been displayed at documenta in Germany in 2012, and at Jupiter Artland in Scotland in 2014.

The sculpture elicited protests from Native American groups prior to being put on public display, and delayed the opening of the gallery's public art garden.  Protesters were offended by a reference in the sculpture to the 1862 hanging of 38 Dakota Indians at Mankato, Minnesota. This is because it was seen as a form of cultural appropriation of Native American culture. Durant agreed to dismantle Scaffold, and after initial plans to burn the piece, it was buried by Dakota tribal elders.  "I made Scaffold as a learning space for people like me, white people who have not suffered the effects of a white supremacist society and who may not consciously know that it exists" said Durant, "white artists need to address issues of white supremacy".

Exhibitions
His work can be found in many public collections including The Art Gallery of Western Australia in Perth, Tate Modern in London, Project Row Houses in Houston, the Walker Art Center in Minneapolis, and the Museum of Modern Art in New York. Durant teaches art at the California Institute of the Arts in Valencia, California.

References

Bibliography 

 Sam Durant et al., The Death of the Artist (New York: Cabinet Books, 2019).

External links
Sam Durant website 
Heyoka Magazine Interview with John LeKay

1961 births
Artists from Seattle
Massachusetts College of Art and Design alumni
California Institute of the Arts alumni
Artists from California
Living people
California Institute of the Arts faculty